KBTA may refer to:

 KBTA (AM), a radio station (1340 AM) licensed to Batesville, Arkansas, United States
 KBTA-FM, a radio station (99.5 FM) licensed to Batesville, Arkansas, United States